A S16 ribosomal protein leader is  a  ribosomal protein leader involved in ribosome biogenesis. It is used as an autoregulatory mechanism to control the concentration of the ribosomal protein S16. Known Examples were predicted in Flavobacteria with bioinformatic approaches. The structure is located in the 5′ untranslated regions of mRNAs encoding ribosomal proteins L16 (rpsP) and the ribosome maturation factor protein (rimM).

References

External links 
 

Ribosomal protein leader